Robert Gawliński (born 31 August 1963) is the lead singer and guitarist of the Polish pop rock band Wilki. He was born in Warsaw.

Discography

References

External links
 
 Official fansite of Robert Gawliński
 Official website of Wilki

1963 births
Living people
Polish guitarists
Polish male guitarists
Musicians from Warsaw
Polish pop singers
Polish rock singers
English-language singers from Poland
Polish lyricists
20th-century Polish  male singers
21st-century Polish male singers
21st-century Polish singers